is a passenger railway station  located in the city of Sanda, Hyōgo Prefecture, Japan. It is operated by the West Japan Railway Company (JR West).

Lines

Station layout
The station consists of two island platforms serving four tracks. The platforms are on am embankment, and the concourse and platform are connected by an underpass and an overpass. As part of barrier-free access, an elevator is installed on the overpass.The two outer lines (Platforms 1 and 4) are the main line, and the two inner lines (Platforms 2 and 3) are the outbound sub-main lines.. Trains arriving at and departing from Sasayamaguchi Station and Fukuchiyama Station stop at (or pass by) outside Platforms 1 and 4 except during the morning rush hour. The station has a Midori no Madoguchi staffed ticket office.

Platforms

Adjacent stations

History
Shin-Sanda Sation opened on 1 November 1986.

Station numbering was introduced in March 2018 with Shin-Sanda being assigned station number JR-G62.

Passenger statistics
In fiscal 2016, the station was used by an average of 14,694 passengers daily

Surrounding area
 Woody Town
 Culture Town
Sanda Industrial Park
Sanda Municipal Hospital

See also
List of railway stations in Japan

References

External links 

 Shin-Sanda Station Station from JR-Odekake.net 

Railway stations in Hyōgo Prefecture
Railway stations in Japan opened in 1899
Sanda, Hyōgo